The Rockport Quarry Limestone is a geologic formation in Michigan. It preserves fossils dating back to the middle Devonian period.

Fossil content

Vertebrates
The Devonian vertebrate fauna of the Rockport Quarry Limestone is the most diverse in Michigan.

Acanthodians

Cartilaginous fish

Placoderms

Invertebrates

Brachiopods

Bryozoans

Crustaceans

Echinoderms

Molluscs

Sponges

Trilobitomorphs

Plants and algae

Cyanophytes

Foraminifera

See also

 List of fossiliferous stratigraphic units in Michigan

References

 

Devonian Michigan
Middle Devonian Series